Bhishma Pratigna may refer to:
 Bhishma (1936 film), also known as Bhishma Pratigna, a 1936 Indian Hindu mythological film
 Bhishma Pratigna (1921 film), an Indian silent film